Dalea mollissima is a desert wildflower plant in the legume family (Fabaceae), with the common names soft prairie clover, downy dalea, and silk dalea.

Distribution
The plant is native to the Mojave Desert, Sonoran Desert, and desert chaparral in adjacent mountains. It is found in California, northeastern Baja California, western Arizona, and southern Nevada.

It grows on desert flats and in washes, under  in elevation.

Description
Dalea mollissima is a  small, mat-forming annual or perennial herbaceous plant .

Its leaves are made up of several pairs of oval-shaped fuzz-covered leaflets. The foliage is similar to Dalea mollis, but is covered with thinner, downier hairs.

It bears fluffy inflorescences of pea-like flowers in white or lavender. Its bloom period is March to May.

The fruit is a single-seeded legume pod.

References

External links
Jepson Manual eFlora (TJM2) treatment of Dalea mollissima
USDA Plants Profile for Dalea mollissima (soft prairie clover)
UC Photos gallery — Dalea mollissima

mollissima
Flora of the California desert regions
Flora of Arizona
Flora of Baja California
Flora of Nevada
Flora of the Sonoran Deserts
Natural history of the Colorado Desert
Natural history of the Mojave Desert
Flora without expected TNC conservation status